Mars Loves Venus is the second full-length album by The Brunettes. It was released in 2004 on Lil' Chief Records.

Track listing
 "Mars Loves Venus" – 2:25
 "Loopy Loopy Love" – 2:44
 "Polyester Meets Acetate" – 3:56
 "Too Big for Gidget" – 3:18
 "Whale in the Sand" – 2:45
 "You Beautiful Militant" – 4:14
 "The Record Store" – 2:58
 "These Things Take Time" – 2:48
 "Best Friend Envy" – 3:12
 "No Regrets" – 2:08
 "Leonard Says" – 2:13
 "Your Heart Dies" – 3:22

Personnel
 Jonathan Bree — Vocals, Guitar, Banjo, Sitar, Synthesizer, Optigan, Drum Machine, Percussion
 Heather Mansfield — Vocals, Organs, Piano, Harmonica, Clarinet, Glockenspiel
 James Milne — Guitar, Bass, Backing vocals, Chamberlin, Vibraphone, Percussion
 Ryan McPhun — Drums, Percussion, Backing vocals

References

External links
Lil' Chief Records: The Brunettes
Lil' Chief Records
The Brunettes on MySpace

2005 albums
The Brunettes albums
Lil' Chief Records albums